Fedderate Castle is a ruined castle near New Deer in Aberdeenshire, Scotland, dating to around 1474 and built by the Crawford family. It was extended by the family in 1519. A drawbridge and causeway provided access to the castle.

History 
On 15 December 1590, Robert Keith, the youngest brother of George Keith, 5th Earl Marischal, fled to Fedderate Castle after being dislodged from Deer Abbey, which he had seized the previous September in the course of a dispute over his inheritance.

Lord William Oliphant with Jacobite forces took control of Fedderate Castle and held out against the forces of Hugh Mackay for more than three weeks, surrendering in October 1690.

The castle is a scheduled monument. Its condition is the result of an attempt to blow up the structure, before its historic designation, "as an impediment to agriculture".

References

Bibliography

External links
 Fedderate Castle Virtual Tour

Castles in Aberdeenshire
Ruined castles in Aberdeenshire
Scheduled Ancient Monuments in Aberdeenshire